The Miss Peru 2018 pageant was held on the night of October 29, 2017. This national beauty contest was held in the historic centre's Municipal Theatre in Lima, Peru, after weeks of events.

The outgoing titleholder, Prissila Howard of Piura crowned her successor, Romina Lozano of Callao at the end of the event.

Lozano represented Peru at Miss Universe 2018.

The first and second runners-up were also selected to represent Peru at the international level, as Andrea Moberg and Kelin Rivera represented Peru at the Miss Grand International 2018 and Miss Eco International pageants, respectively.

The pageant was broadcast by Latina Television for the first time since 2004. The event was hosted by presenter Cristian Rivero with the outside commenting of Miss Peru 2009, Karen Schwarz.

This election became a platform opposing violence against women in Peru: when the 23 candidates took the floor to specify their measurements, each one announced a figure corresponding to the daily violence suffered by women living in Peru. The sequence ended with the following message from the presenter: "Tonight we are not only talking about these 23 women, tonight we are talking about all the women in our country who have rights and deserve respect".

These statements can relate to the complaint of the Weinstein case and were echoed by demonstrations against gender violence and feminicides in the country.

Placements

Special Awards

 Best Regional Costume - Ucayali - Diana Rengifo
 Miss Photogenic - Huanuco- Luciana Fernandez
 Miss Elegance - Arequipa - Kelin Rivera
 Best Hair - Tacna - Vania Osusky
 Most Beautiful Face - Huanuco- Luciana Fernandez
 Best Smile - Piura - Maria Jose Seminario
 Miss Internet - Loreto - Andrea Moberg
 Miss Rosa - Loreto - Andrea Moberg

.

Delegates

 Arequipa - Kelin Rivera 
 Cajamarca - Melina Machuca
 Callao - Romina Lozano
 Cañete - Almendra Marroquin
 Chorrillos - Kristel Aranda 
 Distrito Capital - Jessica McFarlane
 Huánuco - Luciana Fernandez
 Ica - Belgica Guerra
 Iquitos - Fabiola Diaz Zubiate
 La Libertad - Melody Calderon
 La Punta - Camila Canicoba

 Loreto - Andrea Moberg
 Piura - Maria Jose Seminario
 Region Lima - Samantha Batallanos
 Rímac - Juana Acevedo
 San Juan de Miraflores - Pilar Orue
 Spain Perú - Susan Rodriguez
 Sullana - Karen Cueto
 Tacna - Vania Osusky
 Trujillo - Noelia Castro
 Tumbes - Pierina Melendez
 Ucayali -  Diana Rengifo
 Villa El Salvador - Francesca Chavez

Judges
 Magaly Medina - Peruvian journalist and Television producer
 Jessica Newton - President of the Miss Peru Organization
 Luciana Olivares - Strategy and Content Manager at Latina Televisión
 Micael Seo - LG Electronics Marketing Manager
 Dr. Paola Ochoa - Director of Dental Esthetics of Infinity Dental Clinic
 Deborah de Souza - Miss Peru 1993
 Selene Noblecilla - President of Reina Mundial Banano pageant
 Ernesto Bejarano - Marketing Manager of Marina Salt - EMSAL S.A.
 Lady Guillén - Peruvian TV presenter

Music & Special Guests Singers
Swimsuit Competition – Leslie Shaw - "Siempre Mas Fuerte"
Evening Gown Competition – Deyvis Orosco - "Nectar Medley" (El Arbolito/ Ojitos Hechizeros/ No Te Creas Tan Importante)
 Mirella Paz – Miss Peru Anthem (composed by Coco Tafur)
 Ezio Oliva & Jonathan Molly - "Como le Hago"

References

Miss Peru
2017 in Peru
Peru